Harry Evan Auguste Cotton  (27 May 1868 – 7 March 1939), better known as Evan Cotton or H. E. A. Cotton, was a Liberal politician, barrister, administrator, journalist, historian and writer.

Formative years
The son of Henry Cotton, who presided over the 1904 session of the Indian National Congress, and the Irish-born Mary Ryan, he was born at Midnapore, where his father was then posted. He had his early schooling at Mount Liban School, Pau and then at Sherborne School.

He held an open scholarship at Jesus College, Oxford, where he obtained a second class in Classics Honour Mods, followed by second class degrees in history and jurisprudence. He was called to the bar by Lincoln's Inn.

Professional life
Cotton practised at Calcutta High Court from 1893 to 1908. He served as a member of Calcutta Municipal Corporation.
He covered the Delhi Durbar of 1903 as a correspondent of the Manchester Guardian. He subsequently served as the Kolkata correspondent of the Daily News. He undertook the editorship of India, the weekly organ of the British Committee of the Indian National Congress.  He served as President of the Bengal Legislative Council from 1922 to 1925.
He was an active member of the Indian Historical Records Commission and was chairman from 1923 to 1925.

Politics
Evan returned to England in 1906 and joined the Liberal Party. His father was himself a Liberal MP who sat for Nottingham East from 1906–1910. In January 1910, Evan contested the General Election at the Conservative seat of Dulwich;

In March 1910 he was elected as a Progressive Councillor to the London County Council representing Finsbury East;

The Progressives were the local government arm of the Liberal Party. In March 1913 he was re-elected to the LCC;

In July 1918, when a vacancy occurred due to the death of a Liberal MP, for the parliamentary seat of Finsbury East. Cotton was an obvious candidate to defend the seat for the Liberal Party. Due to the wartime electoral truce, he did not face an official Unionist Party opponent and was comfortably elected;

Following boundary changes, Evan's Finsbury East seat was merged with the Unionist seat of Finsbury Central to form a new Finsbury constituency. The Coalition Government chose to publicly endorse the Unionist candidate who was the sitting MP for the old Central seat. This endorsement made Evan's prospects difficult and after only 5 months as an MP he was defeated;

In 1919 he did not defend his Finsbury East seat on the London County Council as after the election he was appointed as an Alderman.

Estimate of the person
In all his activities, his primary concern was for India, a country served by four generations in the family. He provided strong support to the Montagu–Chelmsford Reforms and served on an advisory committee at the India Office in connection with the 1919 Act. He was pivot of a small group that supported reforms. However, the changing political environment dampened his spirits. He later became a severe critic of the constitutional changes that led to the Round Table Conference.

Marriage
In 1896, he married Nora, daughter of William H. Grimley of Bengal ICS. They had a daughter.

Works

Calcutta: Old and New, The Century in India 1800–1900, Hartly House, Calcutta, Murray’s Handbook of India, Burma and Ceylon (13th and 14th editions)

See also
 List of United Kingdom MPs with the shortest service

References

Sources
Who's Who of British members of parliament, Volume II 1886–1918, edited by M. Stenton and S. Lees (Harvester Press: 1978)

1868 births
1939 deaths
People educated at Sherborne School
Alumni of Jesus College, Oxford
British barristers
Companions of the Order of the Indian Empire
Indian National Congress
Liberal Party (UK) MPs for English constituencies
Politicians from Kolkata
UK MPs 1910–1918
Members of London County Council
Progressive Party (London) politicians
People from Paschim Medinipur district
Nathaniel Cotton family